Bunium is a genus of flowering plants in the family Apiaceae, with 45 to 50 species.

Species 
Species include:

Bunium afghanicum Beauverd
Bunium alatum Pimenov & Kljuykov
Bunium alpinum Waldst. & Kit.
Bunium angrenii Korovin
Bunium avromanum (Boiss. & Hausskn.) Drude
Bunium badachschanicum Kamelin
Bunium badghysi (Korovin) Korovin
Bunium bourgaei (Boiss.) Freyn & Sint.
Bunium brachyactis (Post) H.Wolff
Bunium brevifolium Lowe
Bunium bulbocastanum L. – black cumin
Bunium capusii (Franch.) Korovin
Bunium caroides (Boiss.) Hausskn. ex Bornm.
Bunium chabertii (Batt.) Batt.
Bunium chaerophylloides (Regel & Schmalh.) Drude
Bunium cornigerum (Boiss. & Hausskn.) Drude
Bunium cylindricum (Boiss. & Hohen.) Drude
Bunium elegans (Fenzl) Freyn
Bunium fedtschenkoanum Korovin ex Kamelin
Bunium ferulaceum Sm.
Bunium hissaricum Korovin
Bunium intermedium Korovin
Bunium kandaharicum Rech.f.
Bunium kopetdagense Geld.
Bunium korovinii R.Kam. & Geld.
Bunium kuhitangi Nevski
Bunium lindbergii Rech.f. & Riedl
Bunium longilobum Klyuikov
Bunium longipes Freyn
Bunium luristanicum Rech.f.
Bunium microcarpum (Boiss.) Freyn & Bornm.
Bunium nilghirense H.Wolff
Bunium nothum (Clarke) P.K.Mukh.
Bunium nudum (Post) H.Wolff
Bunium pachypodum P.W.Ball
Bunium paucifolium DC.
Bunium persicum (Boiss.) B.Fedtsch.
Bunium pestalozzae Boiss.
Bunium pinnatifolium Kljuykov
Bunium rectangulum Boiss. & Hausskn.
Bunium scabrellum Korovin
Bunium seravschanicum Korovin
Bunium vaginatum Korovin
Bunium verruculosum C.C.Towns.
Bunium wolffii Klyuikov

References

External links 
 
 

Apioideae
Taxa named by Carl Linnaeus
Apioideae genera